Liloy, officially the Municipality of Liloy (Subanen: Benwa Liloy; Chavacano: Municipalidad de Liloy), is a 3rd class municipality in the province of Zamboanga del Norte, Philippines. According to the 2020 census, it has a population of 42,213 people.

Liloy is mainly an agricultural community with an economy that relies mostly on crop production such as corn, rice, coconuts, peanuts, and root crops. It is known as the "Peanut Capital of Zamboanga del Norte".

History
Before its municipal jurisdiction, Liloy was once a barrio of the municipality of Sindangan. By virtue of Executive Order No. 469 issued by President Elpidio Quirino on August 22, 1951, it became an independent municipal corporation, although the municipal officials were not yet organized. The municipality was inaugurated on December 16 of the same year. The first municipal mayor of Liloy was Arsenia Almonte Teves.

Liloy subsequently lost large portions of its territory when the separate municipalities of Salug and Tampilisan were created in 1959 and 1978 respectively.

In 2017, House Bill No. 5040 was introduced in the House of Representatives seeking to carve out a new province from Zamboanga del Norte. The proposed Zamboanga Hermosa province was to consist of 12 municipalities and 2 legislative districts that make up the 3rd legislative district of Zamboanga del Norte. However, the bill ultimately did not pass the 16th congress.

Geography
According to the records of the Municipal Assessor's office, 22% of the municipality's territory comprise the residential area which is sixty-five (65); commercial, nine (9);  industrial, in Barangay Timan and Santa Cruz, ten (10); institutional land, fifty (50);  public school sites(?); and wharf, eight hundred sixty (860) hectares. There are also open areas for road right of way of public highways and roads traversing in the different barangays of the municipality.

It lies on the north-western side of the Zamboanga peninsula, bounded in the north by the Sulu Sea; south, the municipality of Tampilisan; east, the municipality of Salug; and west, the municipality of Labason.

Climate

There are two distinct seasons, the dry and the rainy. Usually, the rainy season starts from the month of June and ends in December while the dry season occurs in the months of January to May. Typhoon comes rarely in this area because it is not within the typhoon belt.

Barangays
Liloy is politically subdivided into 37 barangays. The sitios of Silucap, Bacong, Libertad, Balacan, Tampilisan, Cabangkalan, Tambalang, and Kayoc were elevated into barrios in 1955.

Demographics 

Indigenous people/tribal community: Subanon

Religion

Culture

Liloy's Alay Festival was once a private-funded festival by the Tan family in Barangay Fatima to honor Nuestra Señora Birhen de Regla. At present, it is one of the most celebrated festivals in the town. The Local Government Officials contribute and show support financially and morally for the said activity.

The Araw ng Liloy starts on the 22nd day of August every year. Also known as Linggo ng Liloy, the celebration is held for a week. It is highlighted by a Beauty Pageant to select the Mutya ng Liloy

Tourism
Tourism is centered on its growing developments along the beaches in the Barangays of Patawag, Banigan, Santa Cruz, Timan, and Punta, catering to white sand beaches and corals. Barangay Baybay, the seat of trade and commerce in the town, has also rapidly boomed in trade, industry, education and commerce.

The under-construction two-floor market with an escalator will be the first in the province.

Government
Liloy is governed by a mayor, a vice mayor and eight councilors. Each official is elected publicly to a three-year term. The chief of the Association of Barangay Captains and the President of the Sangguniang Kabataan Federation are also among the members of the municipal council.

Roberto L. Uy, Jr. is the current mayor of the municipality, and John Momar T. Insong is the town's vice mayor.

Municipal Hall
The Municipal Hall is a two-story Batangas-type building built in the late 1950s; repaired in 1987. A one-story annex municipal building was constructed in 1965 and later, repaired in 1990.

Transportation
Liloy can be reached from the capital city of Dipolog by overland transportation via the National Highway.

Bus terminals for land transportation are situated at down and uptown area (Barangay Fatima).

Liloy Seaport
The port is situated at barangay Lamao and currently managed under the Philippine Ports of Authority (PPA).

Liloy Airport
Liloy Airport is an airport serving the general area of Liloy. It is classified as a feeder airport by the Air Transportation Office, and under the jurisdiction of the Civil Aviation Authority of the Philippines.

It is one of the three domestic airports in the province, located in Barangay Comunal. It was first developed in 1950 under the administration of Mayor Aquilino Bomediano Sr. The first OIC of Liloy Airport was Tony Macias, a Filipino-American citizen.

Between the years 1960 to 1970, three twelve-seater PAL planes served their flights to domestic destinations like Dipolog, Cebu and Davao.

Current OIC of Liloy Airport is Edwardo Toledo. Private and government charter planes and choppers usually land at the airport.

Education

Liloy I District
Elementary

Secondary
Patawag National High School - is formerly Liloy NHS - Patawag Extension located at the municipality's barangay of Patawag.

Liloy II District
Elementary

Secondary
Liloy National High School - is a public institution of learning for high school students in the municipality. Its primary goal is to provide quality instruction to pursue the goals of Secondary Education as a link to tertiary level.

Liloy III District
Elementary

Secondary
Compra National High School - is a former extension campus of the Liloy NHS located at barangay Compra, a southern part of the municipality along the National Highway. It caters students from its neighboring feeder elementary schools located in the municipalities of Liloy, Tampilisan and Kalawit.

Private Schools

Lisun Institute - is a private institute located in the heart of the Barangay Fatima, near the Fatima Public Market. It also offers some College courses which was founded in the 1960s.

Liloy Immanuel School - is a private school in Liloy founded by CAMACOP.

Ave Maria College- is the first and so far the only Catholic tertiary school in the town.

Assumption of Mary Parochial School, Inc.

Higher Ground Baptist School

References

External links

 Liloy Profile at PhilAtlas.com
 [ Philippine Standard Geographic Code]
Philippine Census Information

Municipalities of Zamboanga del Norte
Establishments by Philippine executive order